Out of Africa is a 1985 American epic romantic drama film directed and produced by Sydney Pollack, and starring Meryl Streep and Robert Redford. The film is based loosely on the 1937 autobiographical book Out of Africa written by Isak Dinesen (the pseudonym of Danish author Karen Blixen), with additional material from Dinesen's 1960 book Shadows on the Grass and other sources.

The book was adapted into a screenplay by the writer Kurt Luedtke, and filmed in 1984. Streep played Karen Blixen, Redford played Denys Finch Hatton, and Klaus Maria Brandauer played Baron Bror Blixen. Others in the film include Michael Kitchen as Berkeley Cole, Malick Bowens as Farah, Stephen Kinyanjui as the Chief, Michael Gough as Lord Delamere, Suzanna Hamilton as Felicity, and the model and actress Iman as Mariammo. The film received generally positive reviews from critics. It was also a commercial success and won seven Academy Awards including Best Picture and Best Director for Pollack.

Plot
Karen Blixen recalls her life in Africa where she moved in 1913 as an unmarried wealthy Dane. After having been spurned by her Swedish nobleman lover, she asks his brother, Baron Bror Blixen, to marry out of mutual convenience and they move to the vicinity of Nairobi, British East Africa.  Using her funds, he is to set up a dairy ranch, with her joining him a few months later, at which time they will marry. En route to Nairobi, her train is hailed by a big-game hunter named Denys Finch Hatton, who knows her fiancé and entrusts his haul of ivory to her.

She is greeted at the railway station by Farah, the Somali headman hired by Bror, who is nowhere to be found. She is taken to the recently founded Muthaiga Club. She enters the men-only salon to ask for her husband and, because of her gender, is asked to leave. Karen and Bror marry before the day is out and she becomes Baroness Blixen.

She then learns that Bror has changed their agreed-upon plan and has spent her money to establish a coffee farm. She quickly learns that the farm is at too high an elevation to offer much of a chance of success. She needs Bror's help in building and managing this farm, but his interest is more in guiding game hunting safaris than in farming.

Karen comes to love Africa and the African people and is taken in by the breathtaking view of the nearby Ngong Hills and the Great Rift Valley beyond. Meanwhile, she looks after the Kikuyu people who are squatting on her land. Among other things, she establishes a school, helps with their medical needs, and arbitrates their disputes. She also attempts to establish a formal European homelife on par with the other upper class colonists in the area. Meanwhile, she becomes friends with a young woman, Felicity (whose character is based on a young Beryl Markham). Eventually, Karen and Bror develop feelings for each other. But Bror continues to pursue other sexual relationships because their marriage is still a partnership based on convenience.

As the First World War reaches East Africa, the colonists form a militia led by the colonial patriarch Lord Delamere, which includes Denys and Bror among their number. A military expedition sets out in search of the forces from the neighboring German colony of German East Africa. Responding to the militia's need for supplies, Karen leads a difficult expedition to find them and returns safely. Shortly after the end of the war, in the evenings, Karen makes up exotic and imaginative stories to entertain her visitors.

Karen discovers that Bror has given her syphilis. As she is unable to receive proper treatment in Nairobi, she returns to Denmark for treatment and recuperation. Bror agrees to manage the farm while she is away. When she returns, now unable to bear children, Bror resumes his safari work and they begin to live separately.

The relationship between Karen and Denys develops and he comes to live with her. Denys acquires a Gipsy Moth biplane and often takes Karen flying. Karen and Bror get a divorce on the grounds of Bror's infidelity. When Karen learns that Denys has taken one of her female acquaintances on a private safari, Karen comes to realize that Denys does not share her desire for a monogamous, domestic relationship. He assures her that when he is with her he wants to be with her and states that a marriage is immaterial to their relationship. Eventually, this drives them apart and, refusing to be tied down, he moves out.

The farm eventually yields a good harvest, but a fire destroys much of the farm and factory, forcing her to sell out. She prepares for her departure from Kenya to Denmark by appealing to the incoming governor to provide land for her Kikuyu workers to allow them to stay together and by selling most of her remaining possessions at a rummage sale.  Denys visits the now-empty house and Karen comments that the house should have been (empty) all-along and, as with her other efforts, the returning of things to their natural state is as it should be. Denys says that he was just getting used to her things.

As he is about to depart for a safari scouting trip in his airplane, they agree that the following Friday he will return and fly her to Mombasa; with Karen then continuing on to Denmark. Friday comes and Denys does not appear. Bror then arrives to tell her that Denys' biplane has crashed and burned in Tsavo.  During Denys' funeral, Karen recites an excerpt of a poem by A. E. Housman about a lauded athlete dying young who, as with Denys, is not fated to decline into old age. Later, as she is about to depart, she goes to the Muthaiga Club to complete arrangements for forwarding any mail. The members, having come to admire her, invite her into the men-only salon for a toast. At the railway station, she gives Farah the compass that Denys had given to her and says goodbye to Farah, then turns back to ask him to say her name so she can hear his voice one last time. Later, Farah writes to Karen in Denmark, telling her that a pair of lions often visit Denys' grave.

As the movie ends, the on-screen narrative notes that Karen later became a published author under the pen name Isak Dinesen. Among her work is the memoir about her experiences in Africa, Out of Africa, the first line from which is used to introduce this film. She never returned to Africa.

Cast

Production
The film tells the story as a series of six loosely coupled episodes from Karen's life, intercut with her narration. The final two narrations, the first a reflection on Karen's experiences in Kenya and the second a description of Finch Hatton's grave, were taken from her book Out of Africa, while the others were written for the film in imitation of her very lyrical writing style. The pace of this film is often rather slow, reflecting Blixen's book, "Natives dislike speed, as we dislike noise..."

Klaus Maria Brandauer was director Sydney Pollack's only choice for Bror Blixen, even having trouble to pick a replacement when it appeared that Brandauer's schedule would prevent him from participating. Robert Redford became Finch Hatton, with Pollack thinking Redford had a charm no British actor could convey. Meryl Streep landed the part by showing up for her meeting with the director wearing a low-cut blouse and a push-up bra, as Pollack had originally thought the actress did not have enough sex appeal for the role.

Out of Africa was filmed using descendants of several people of the Kikuyu tribe who are named in the book, including the grandson of chief Kinyanjui who played his grandfather. Much of it was filmed in the Karen / Lang'ata area near the actual Ngong Hills outside Nairobi. The Chyulu Hills stood in for the less picturesque Ngong Hills. As Karen's farmhouse was at the time of filming a part of a local nursing school, the filming took place in her nearby first house "Mbogani", which is a dairy today. Her actual house, known as "Mbagathi" is now the Karen Blixen Museum. A substantial part of the filming took place in the Scott house and in a recreation of 1910s Nairobi built in an area of unoccupied land in Langata.

The scenes depicting the Government House were shot at Nairobi School with the administration block providing a close replica of British colonial governors' residences. The scenes set in Denmark were actually filmed in Surrey, England.

Historical differences

Although bearing the name of Dinesen's book, the picture was actually taken from two other books (not written by her) as well.  It quotes the start of the Dinesen's book, "I had a farm in Africa, at the foot of the Ngong Hills" [p. 3], and Karen recites, "He prayeth well that loveth well both man and bird and beast" from The Rime of the Ancient Mariner, which becomes the epitaph inscribed on Finch Hatton's grave marker [p. 370].

The film omits much of Dinesen's book, such as a devastating locust swarm, some local shootings, and her writings about the German army. The production also plays down the size of her  farm, which had 800 Kikuyu workers and an 18-oxen wagon. Scenes show Karen as owning only one dog, but actually, she had two similar dogs named Dawn and Dusk.

The movie also takes liberties with Denys and Karen's romance. They met at a hunting club, not in the plains. Denys was away from Kenya for two years on military assignment in Egypt, which is not mentioned. Denys took up flying and began to lead safaris after he moved in with Karen. The film also ignores that Karen was pregnant at least once with Finch Hatton's child but suffered from miscarriages. Furthermore, Denys was an English aristocrat, but this fact was minimized by the hiring of the actor Robert Redford, an inarguably all-American actor who had previously worked with Pollack. When Redford accepted the contract to play, he did so fully intending to play him as an Englishman. Pollack, however, felt an English accent would be distracting for the audience, and told Redford to use his real accent. In fact, Redford reportedly had to re-record some of his lines from early takes in the filming, in which he still spoke with a trace of English accent.

The title scenes of the film show the main railway, from Mombasa to Nairobi, as traveling through the Kenyan Rift Valley, on the steep back side of the actual Ngong Hills. However, the real railway track is located on the higher, opposite side of the Ngong Hills. The passenger car was actually a small combination office/sleeper that was originally used by supervisors during the building of the Uganda Railway and was the actual car from which a man was taken and killed by a marauding lioness.

Soundtrack

The music for Out of Africa was composed and conducted by veteran English composer John Barry. The score included a number of outside pieces such as Mozart's Clarinet Concerto and African traditional songs. The soundtrack garnered Barry an Oscar for Best Original Score and sits in fifteenth place in the American Film Institute's list of top 25 American film scores. The soundtrack was first released through MCA Records in 1985 and features 12 tracks of score at a running time of just over thirty-three minutes. In 1987 a Special Edition was issued that included the song "The Music of Goodbye (Love Theme)" by Melissa Manchester & Al Jarreau. A rerecording conducted by Joel McNeely and performed by the Royal Scottish National Orchestra was released in 1997 through Varèse Sarabande and features eighteen tracks of score at a running time just under thirty-nine minutes.

Charts

Certifications

Technical notes
In the Director's Notes on the DVD of Pollack's 2005 film The Interpreter, Pollack himself stated that he filmed Out of Africa and his later films of that decade in 1.85:1 widescreen; and that it "...probably was one I should have had in widescreen" (i.e. anamorphic 2.39:1 widescreen). In his director's notes, Pollack stated that prior to the filming of Out of Africa, he made motion pictures exclusively in the anamorphic 2.39:1 widescreen format and style, and that he did not resume the anamorphic 2.39:1 widescreen format, due to the rise of pan and scan which had affected the compositions of many anamorphic movies, until his last movie, The Interpreter, in 2005.

Release

Critical reception
On review aggregator Rotten Tomatoes, the film holds an approval rating of 61% based on 88 reviews, with an average rating of 6.90/10. The website's critical consensus reads, "Though lensed with stunning cinematography and featuring a pair of winning performances from Meryl Streep and Robert Redford, Out of Africa suffers from excessive length and glacial pacing." Metacritic reports a score of 69 out of 100 based on 18 critics, indicating "Generally favorable reviews".

Roger Ebert of the Chicago Sun-Times gave the film four stars out of four and called it "one of the great recent epic romances," adding, "What we have here is an old-fashioned, intelligent, thoughtful love story, told with enough care and attention that we really get involved in the passions among the characters." Vincent Canby of The New York Times described it as "a big, physically elaborate but wispy movie" with Redford's character "a total cipher, and a charmless one at that. It's not Mr. Redford's fault. There's no role for him to act." Gene Siskel of the Chicago Tribune gave the film two-and-a-half stars out of four and declared, "My basic problem with this otherwise sumptuous and well-acted film is that I never was able to accept Redford in character ... He seems distant to the point of distraction. He is not convincing in his period outfits. He looks and acts as if he just walked out of the safari fitting room at Abercrombie & Fitch." David Ansen of Newsweek wrote that the film was "well worth the wait," calling it "a sprawling but always intelligent romantic epic that depicts Karen Blixen's struggles to hold on to both the man and the land she loves and cannot possess." 

Sheila Benson of the Los Angeles Times wrote that the film "seems to be just the thing for famished culture mavens at Christmastime. Unfortunately, and through no fault of Meryl Streep, there doesn't seem to be enough electricity generated out there in Africa to power a love story 2½ hours long." Variety found that the film "rarely really comes to life except when Redford is around, which unfortunately is not often in the first hour," but once Streep and Redford get together it becomes "a wonderful romance, probably Redford's best since 'The Way We Were.'" 

Pauline Kael of The New Yorker described the film as "unsatisfying" and wrote that Streep is "animated in the early scenes; she's amusing when she acts ditsy, and she has some oddly affecting moments. Her character doesn't deepen though, or come to mean more to us, and Redford doesn't give out with anything for her to play against." Paul Attanasio of The Washington Post stated that the film "has little in the way of narrative drive" and "rarely seems more than an elevated form of tourism."

Reviewing the film in 2009, James Berardinelli wrote, "Watching Out of Africa a quarter of a century after its release, it's almost impossible to guess how it won the Oscar for Best Picture ... Sydney Pollack's direction is quietly competent and the acting by Meryl Streep and Robert Redford is top notch. But the lazy story is little more than an ordinary melodrama that simmers without ever reaching a boil. To tell the truth, during the entirety of the movie's nearly three-hour running length, I was more interested in the scenery and Barry's music than I was in the characters."

Box office
The film was the fifth-highest grossing film of 1985 in the United States and Canada with a gross of $87 million. It grossed $227.5 million worldwide and was the second highest-grossing film in Germany with a gross of $23 million.

Accolades

American Film Institute lists:
 2002 AFI's 100 Years... 100 Passions #13
 2005 AFI's 100 Years of Film Scores #15

References

External links
 
 
 
 
 

1985 films
1985 romantic drama films
American biographical films
American romantic drama films
Swahili-language films
Films directed by Sydney Pollack
Best Drama Picture Golden Globe winners
Best Picture Academy Award winners
American epic films
Drama films based on actual events
Films based on Danish novels
Films set in Denmark
Films set in Kenya
Films set in the British Empire
Films set in the 1910s
Films set in the 1920s
Films set in the 1930s
Films shot in England
Films shot in Kenya
Films featuring a Best Supporting Actor Golden Globe winning performance
Films that won the Best Sound Mixing Academy Award
Films whose art director won the Best Art Direction Academy Award
Films whose cinematographer won the Best Cinematography Academy Award
Films whose director won the Best Directing Academy Award
Films whose writer won the Best Adapted Screenplay Academy Award
Films that won the Best Original Score Academy Award
American historical romance films
Romantic epic films
Universal Pictures films
Films based on works by Karen Blixen
Films scored by John Barry (composer)
Films whose writer won the Best Adapted Screenplay BAFTA Award
Films produced by Sydney Pollack
1980s English-language films
Films produced by Kim Jorgensen
1980s American films